Barnards Green is one of the main population areas of Malvern, Worcestershire, England, situated approximately  east and downhill from Great Malvern, the town's traditional centre.

Governance
The southern part of Barnards Green constitutes the major part of the Chase ward of the civil parish governed by Malvern Town Council. As well as Barnards Green, the ward also includes the extensive Ministry of Defence property occupied by QinetiQ, the campus of The Chase school, the village of Poolbrook, and the largely rural south-eastern area of the adjoining Poolbrook and Malvern commons. To the north, the Barnards Green area spills into the Pickersleigh ward.

Population
As with the rest of Malvern, Barnards Green owes much of its development to the area's rapid expansion from a cluster of hamlets and manors to a busy spa town during the mid-19th century. Barnards Green experienced a further population boost in 1942 when the Telecommunications Research Establishment (TRE) relocated to Malvern to occupy a site having two of its main entrances in the Barnards Green area. In the early 1950s the construction of the large Pound Bank council estate led to an increase in the population, and to the commercial activity in the shopping centre. Population figures for Barnards Green as an area are not recorded separately.

Geography
At the centre of Barnard's Green is a pear-shaped roundabout where (clockwise) the Barnards Green Road, B4211 / B4208 from the town centre, Pickersleigh Road (B4208), Upper Chase Road, Barnards Green Road (which forks to become Poolbrook Road (B4208) and Guarlford Road (B4211), Court Road, and Avenue Road all meet. Barnards Green is a short walk away from the Great Malvern railway station, a listed Victorian building.

Amenities and landmarks

The centre of Barnard's Green is marked by the Twelve Apostles Island, a pear-shaped traffic roundabout in the central shopping area with its Art Deco style memorial bus shelter, and the nearby Hand of Peace sculpture in Portland stone by artist Rose Garrard. while several large housing developments around the main shopping area such as Pound Bank, are referred to by more local names. Almost every kind of urban commerce is represented in the immediate area of the island by around 60 shops and offices, including a butcher, bakery, patisserie, Post Office, cafe, locksmith, DIY store, convenience stores, a supermarket, a small industrial complex, retirement homes, a guest house, law offices, and a variety of snack bars, and traditional and ethnic take-aways.

Education
The larger of Malvern's two secondary schools, The Chase, administered by the Worcestershire Educational Services, draws 1,800 students aged 11 – 18 from the Malvern district and is located a few hundred yards away from the village centre in Geraldine Road, and two primary schools are located in the immediate area.

Sport and leisure
A basketball facility constructed in 2021 lies partway between Barnards Green and Malvern Link.

Transport

Rail

Bus
Several local bus services connect Barnards Green with the surrounding area including the 42, S42 operated by Astons coaches stopping in Barnards Green bus shelter. Serving areas further afield are: 
the  Malvern to  Worcester route 44, 44A, 44B operated by First Diamond serving stops  at  the  Barnards Green bus shelter and Pound Bank; The Worcester –  Upton-upon-Severn – Malvern route 362/363 operated by Diamond serves that stops at  the Barnards Green bus shelter  and the Malvern – Gloucester – Cheltenham route 377 (Saturdays only) operated by  Diamond, stopping at  the Court Road shops and the Barnards Green bus shelter.

Air
The nearest major airport is Birmingham approximately one hour by road via the M5 and M42 motorways. Gloucestershire Airport located at Staverton, in the Borough of Tewkesbury near Malvern is a busy General Aviation airport used mainly for private charter and scheduled flights to destinations such as the islands of Jersey, Guernsey, and the Isle of Man, pilot training, and by the aircraft of emergency services.

Notable residents
Charles Hastings, founder of the British Medical Association, spent his final years at Hastings House in Barnards Green.

Compass

References

Further reading

External links

Villages in Worcestershire
Malvern Hills District